The Merman's Children is a 1979 fantasy novel by American writer Poul Anderson, inspired by legends of Mermen and Mermaids from Danish folklore, in particular the ballad Agnete og Havmanden. Portions of the work had previously been published as an identically titled novella and the novelette "The Tupilak" in the anthologies Flashing Swords! #1 (1973) and Flashing Swords! #4: Barbarians and Black Magicians (1977). The complete novel was first published by hardcover by Berkley/Putnam in September 1979, which also issued two later editions, a Science Fiction Book Club hardcover edition in February 1980 and a paperback edition in October 1980. The first British editions were issued in 1981 by Sphere Books (paperback) and Sidgwick & Jackson (hardcover). It was also included in the Sidgwick & Jackson omnibus Science Fiction Special 44 in 1983.

Plot summary
Set at the end of the medieval era, The Merman's Children details the end of the last bastion of the kingdom of the Merfolk, one of the Faery peoples being displaced by the advancing tide of Christianity. The city of the Liri king (the Merman of the title) lies beneath the waves off the shores of Denmark, peacefully coexisting with the landbound humans until exorcised by a zealous priest and his churchbells. The majority of the Merfolk are destroyed or scatter, unable to withstand the onslaught, leaving only the king's halfling offspring by a human lover. The story follows them and their various fates as they seek a place to call their own, in locales as varied as the dying Norse colonies in Greenland and the coastlands of Dalmatia.

Reception
The book received fifth place in the polling for the 1980 Locus Award for Best Fantasy Novel.

References

External links 
 
Fantastic Fiction entry

1979 American novels
American fantasy novels
Novels by Poul Anderson
Novels set in Denmark
Danish folklore
Berkley Books books
1979 fantasy novels
Mermaid novels